The 1899 Calgary municipal election took place on December 11, 1899 to elect a Mayor to sit on the sixteenth Calgary City Council from January 2, 1900 to January 7, 1901. All Aldermen candidates for council were acclaimed, and there was only a contest for the position of Mayor.

Results

Mayor

Councillors

Ward 1
Thomas Alexander Hatfield
William Mahon Parslow
Solomon Sheldwyn Spafford

Ward 2
John Creighton
James Hedley Grierson
Hugh Neilson

Ward 3
Donald J. Gunn
Thomas Underwood
Isacc Stephen Gerow Van Wart

See also
List of Calgary municipal elections

References

Sources
Frederick Hunter: THE MAYORS AND COUNCILS  OF  THE CORPORATION OF CALGARY Archived March 3, 2020

Politics of Calgary
Municipal elections in Calgary
1899 elections in Canada
1890s in Calgary